Daniil Vyacheslavovich Yegorov (born 7 September 1975, Moscow, RSFSR, USSR) is a Russian lawyer serving as Director of the Federal Taxation Service since 2020. Prior to his appointment, he spent nine years as the service's Deputy Director. He has been described as a leading "young technocrat" in Moscow.

Since 26 October 2020, Yegorov holds the highest federal state civilian service rank - 1st class Active State Councillor of the Russian Federation.

Early life and education 
In 1998, he graduated from the Peoples' Friendship University of Russia with a specialist degree in jurisprudence (law degree).

Career

Legal career 

Following college, from 2000 to 2001, Yegorov was a member of the commission of the Interregional Collegium of Advocates for Assistance to Enterprises and Citizens (but he didn't have an advocate's status). During this period he worked as a legal counsel and - subsequently - as a head of the legal department for the private joint-stock company Eneko.

Federal Tax Service career 
In late 2001, he left the private sector and became a federal state civilian service official. His first appointment was a position of a 1st category specialist and consultant of the Department for the city of Moscow of the Ministry of Taxes and Tax Collection of Russia. He served in the tax service ever since, assuming leadership of the department of information support, electronic data entry and office inspections in 2003, subsequently moving to the lead role in the office inspections department at the Interdistrict Inspectorate of the Ministry of Taxes and Duties of Russia No. 44. In 2005 he took over the dual roles of head of the department of desk inspections and head of the department of field inspections No. 2 of the Interdistrict Inspectorate of the Federal Tax Service of Russia No. 50 in Moscow. In 2009 he moved up to Deputy Head of the Control Department, and the following year took over as head of the Department of Dispute Resolution for Individuals and Major Taxpayers, and head of the Pre-trial Audit Directorate. In 2011, he was appointed to the position of the Deputy Head of the Federal Taxation Service.

He was promoted to the federal state civilian service rank of the 3rd class Active State Councillor of the Russian Federation (the Presidential Decree of 31 August 2012 No.1251) and - subsequently - to the rank of the 2nd class Active State Councillor of the Russian Federation (the Presidential Decree of 31 March 2014 No.185).

Head of the Federal Tax Service 
Yegorov was appointed to the postition of the Head of the Federal Taxation Service by the Prime Minister Mikhail Mishustin Order of 17 January 2020 No.21-R.
 He is the first lawyer to ever hold this position.

Yegorov was promoted to the federal state civilian service rank of the 1st class Active State Councillor of the Russian Federation by the Presidential Decree of 26 October 2020 No.642.

Almost immediately upon assuming office, Yegorov was confronted with the COVID-19 pandemic, and has led Russia's tax service in an effort to build a digital universal basic income infrastructure to be able to provide minimum wage financial assistance to displaced employees laid off in any future lockdowns during the duration of the pandemic. The system would also allow direct payments to endangered companies.

Sanctions
In December 2022 the EU sanctioned Daniil Yegorov in relation to the 2022 Russian invasion of Ukraine.

Awards 
Yegorov is a recipient of the following medals and orders:
 II Class Medal of the Order "For Merit to the Fatherland" (the Presidential Decree of 15 November 2013 No.843)
 Order of Honour (the Presidential Decree of 12 June 2017 No.266)

Personal life 
Yegorov is married and has two children. He is an avid skier and snowboarder, and is fluent in English, with an interest in literature and theater.

Assets and income 
In 2018 Yegorov and his wife each earned 8.2 million rubles ($111,000 USD) according to their tax statements. 

In 2019 Yegorov earned 44.9 million rubles ($611,000 USD), which the press service of the Federal Tax Service explained consisted of his salary at the tax service, income from the sale of property, and external bank deposits. His wife's income also increased to 28.63 million rubles ($390,000 USD).

Yegorov and his wife own six apartments, the largest, a  condo, officially belongs to Yegorov's wife.

References 

1975 births
Living people
1st class Active State Councillors of the Russian Federation
Lawyers from Moscow
Heads of the Federal Tax Service
Peoples' Friendship University of Russia alumni
21st-century Russian lawyers